The Pakistan cricket team toured Zimbabwe between 28 August and 18 September 2011. Pakistan played one Test, three One Day Internationals and two Twenty20 Internationals against the Zimbabwe national team, and one first-class match against a Zimbabwean representative side.

Squads

 Pakistan also named six "standby" players for the tour: Hammad Azam, Khurram Manzoor, Mohammad Talha, Sarfraz Ahmed, Sharjeel Khan and Shoaib Malik (subject to clearance from integrity committee)

Tour match

Zimbabwe XI v Pakistanis (two-day match)

Test series

Only Test

ODI series

1st ODI

2nd ODI

3rd ODI

T20 Series

1st T20

2nd T20

References

External links

Zim
2011 in Zimbabwean cricket
International cricket competitions in 2011
2011